Five ships of the United States Navy have been named USS Cincinnati, after the city of Cincinnati, Ohio.

  was an ironclad river gunboat commissioned in 1862, sunk twice in battle and raised each time, and sold in 1866.
  was a protected cruiser in service from 1894 to 1919.
  was a light cruiser commissioned in 1924, on patrols in the Atlantic Ocean during World War II, and scrapped in 1946.
  was a  nuclear attack submarine in service from 1978 to 1996.

Sources
 

United States Navy ship names